Custom House, London can refer to:

 Custom House, Newham, an area in the London Borough of Newham
 Custom House, City of London, a Grade I listed building in the City of London